On the continent of Antarctica, the Aramis Range is the third range south in the Prince Charles Mountains, situated 11 miles southeast of the Porthos Range and extending for about 30 miles in a southwest–northeast direction. It was first visited in January 1957 by Australian National Antarctic Research Expeditions (ANARE) southern party led by W.G. Bewsher, who named it for a character in Alexandre Dumas' novel The Three Musketeers, the most popular book read on the southern journey.

Features

Amery Peaks 
The Amery Peaks are a group of peaks which extend for about  along the southeast side of Nemesis Glacier. They were discovered by the ANARE southern party of 1956–57 and so named because of their proximity to the Amery Ice Shelf.

It was named for Fritz Loewe, a member of the ANARE reconnaissance party in the Wyatt Earp, 1947–48, and the Australian observer with the French Expedition on the Adélie Coast, 1951–52. It and the Medvecky Peaks arise from the Loewe Massif.
It was named for John A. McKenzie, a cook at Mawson Station in 1956.
 Mount Seaton is a prominent domed peak situated about 3 nautical miles (6 km) south of Sandilands Nunatak. It was named for Pilot Officer John Seaton, a RAAF pilot with the Antarctic Flight at Mawson Station in 1956.
 Ritchie Point is a well defined point at the extremity of the large, flat rock feature extending northeastward from Amery Peaks. It was named for F.A. Ritchie, cook at Mawson Station in 1965.

Other mountains

 The Medvecky Peaks are a group of peaks rising from the northwest part of Loewe Massif, in the eastern part of the Aramis Range. They were plotted from ANARE air photographs, and were named by ANCA for A. Medvecky, a geologist with the ANARE Prince Charles Mountains survey in 1969.
Discovered by the ANARE southern party led by W.G. Bewsher in December 1956. Named by ANCA after Gordon Abbs, radio operator at Mawson Station in 1956.
 Mount Bewsher is a prominent flat-topped mountain about 6 nautical miles (11 km) east of Mount McMahon. First visited by the ANARE southern party (1956–57) led by W.G. Bewsher, officer in charge at Mawson Station in 1956, for whom it is named.
It was plotted from ANARE air photos taken in 1956 and 1960, and named by ANCA for G. Butterworth, a radio officer at Wilkes Station in 1963 and at Mawson Station in 1966.
 Mount Dowie is a ridgelike mountain which rises to a central crest, about 4 nautical miles (7 km) west of Mount Hollingshead in the Aramis Range. It was sighted by the ANARE southern party led by W.G. Bewsher in January 1957, and named for Dr. Donald A. Dowie, medical officer at Mawson Station in 1956.
It was plotted from ANARE air photos taken in 1956 and 1960, and was named by ANCA for S.W. Grimsley, technical officer (ionosphere) at Wilkes Station in 1963.
It was visited in January 1957 by the ANARE southern party led by W.G. Bewsher, and named for John A. Hollingshead, a radio supervisor at Mawson Station in 1956.
It was first visited by the ANARE southern party December 1956, and was named by ANCA for Sergeant G. Johansen, Royal Australian Air Force, an airframe fitter at Mawson Station in 1956.
It was plotted from ANARE air photos, and was named by ANCA after Koshiro Kizaki, a glaciologist at Mawson Station in 1966, and later Professor of Geology, Ryukyu University, Okinawa.
It was plotted from ANARE air photos, and was named by ANCA for A.E. McGrath, assistant diesel mechanic at Mawson Station in 1963.
It was plotted from ANARE air photos, and was named for R. McMahon, officer in charge at Mawson Station in 1963.
 Mount Ormay is a ridgelike mountain 1 nautical mile (1.9 km) south of Mount Butterworth. Plotted from ANARE air photos taken in 1956 and 1960. Named by ANCA for P.I. Ormay, plumber at Wilkes Station in 1963.
 Mount Sundberg is a pyramidal peak surmounting the central part of Thomson Massif. First visited in December 1956 by the ANARE southern party led by W.G. Bewsher. Named by ANCA for Sgt. G. Sundberg, engine fitter with the RAAF Antarctic Flight at Mawson Station in 1956.

Nunataks 

They were visited in January 1957 by the ANARE southern party of 1956–57. This was the eastern end of a photo baseline, with Mount Hollingshead as the western end, hence the name.
It was plotted from ANARE air photos, and named by ANCA for E.V. Davern, a radio operator at Wilkes Station in 1963, and senior weather observer (radio) there in 1967.
It was plotted from ANARE air photos, and was named by ANCA for D.R. Edwards, a radio technician at Mawson Station in 1969, who took part in the Prince Charles Mountains Survey in 1969.
They were plotted from ANARE air photos taken in 1960, and were named by ANCA for R.G. Hall, an assistant diesel mechanic at Wilkes Station in 1964.
It was plotted from ANARE air photos, and named by ANCA for Dr. J.W. Hudson, a medical officer at Mawson Station in 1966.
They were plotted from ANARE air photos, and were named by ANCA for B. Kilfoyle, a physicist at Mawson Station in 1966.
 Sandilands Nunatak is a small, solitary nunatak about 3 nautical miles (6 km) north of Mount Seaton. It lies in the middle of and near the northern end of Nemesis Glacier. Sighted in December 1956 by an ANARE sledging party led by P.W. Crohn. Named by ANCA for A.H. Sandilands, radio operator at Mawson Station in 1957.
 Sullivan Nunataks are three nunataks lying about 2 nautical miles (3.7 km) northeast of Mount Bewsher. Plotted from ANARE air photos. Named by ANCA for R.N. Sullivan, radio operator at Wilkes Station in 1968, who died on a field trip on July 22, 1968.

Glaciers 

 Battye Glacier is a glacier flowing east into Radok Lake in the Aramis Range. It was plotted from ANARE air photos taken in 1956 and 1960, and named by ANCA for A.C. Battye, glaciologist at Wilkes Station in 1962.
 Charybdis Glacier is a large glacier which drains northeast between the Porthos Range and the Aramis Range. It was discovered by an ANARE southern party led by W.G. Bewsher in December 1956 and named after whirlpool monster Charybdis because of the considerable difficulty experienced in traversing this region due to the glacier.
 The McKinnon Glacier is a glacier flowing southeast from Nemesis Glacier to Beaver Lake in the eastern part of the Aramis Range.The area was first visited by an ANARE party in 1956 and mapped from ANARE air photographs. The glacier was named by ANCA for Graeme W. McKinnon, Geographical Officer with the Antarctic Division, Melbourne, and Officer in Charge of the ANARE Prince Charles Mountains survey party in 1969.
 Nemesis Glacier is a large glacier which flows northeast through the center of the Aramis Range. Discovered in January 1957 by ANARE southern party under W.G. Bewsher, and named after Homer's Nemesis because considerable difficulty was experienced in traversing the region due to the glacier.

Other features 
 Beaver Lake is a lake of smooth ice, 7 mi long and 5 mi wide, enclosed on the south and east by Flagstone Bench and Jetty Peninsula. The lake is situated at the south end of an area of rough ice (a stagnant glacier), 17 mi ESE of the Aramis Range. Discovered by ANARE personnel in 1956. An ANARE camp was established in the vicinity in September 1957 and the lake was used extensively as a landing area by Beaver aircraft.
It was photographed by ANARE in 1956. This moraine was crossed many times in January–February 1969 by J. Dart, radio officer with the ANARE party camped at Radok Lake on his way to the aircraft landing strip used to supply the camp.
 Else Platform is an elevated, flat-topped mass of rock at the north end of Jetty Peninsula. The feature was the site of a survey station occupied by M.N. Rubeli, a surveyor with the ANARE Prince Charles Mountains survey in 1969. It was named after H. Else, a helicopter pilot with the survey.
 Flagstone Bench is a large rock bench which is littered with flaggy slabs of sandstone, bordering the southeast sides of Radok Lake and Beaver Lake. It was visited by ANARE survey parties in 1957 and 1958; the descriptive name was applied by ANCA.
It was plotted from ANARE air photos taken in 1960, and was named by ANCA for R.J. Francey, a cosmic ray physicist at Mawson Station in 1964.
It was photographed from ANARE aircraft in 1956, and was first crossed on foot on 1 February 1969 by geologist David John Grainger and surveyor Jeff Fox during the ANARE Prince Charles Mountains survey. It was later named by ANCA for Grainger.
It was plotted from ANARE air photos, and was named by ANCA for S.T. Harvey, a senior technician (electronics) at Wilkes Station in 1965.
It was first sighted from Mount Bewsher by an ANARE field party in January 1957 and named "Husky Dome" to commemorate the sledge dogs used by the party. The earlier name was amended to Husky Massif by ANARE in 1970 and is considered more descriptive.
 Jetty Peninsula is an elongated, steep-sided, almost flat-topped peninsula that extends northward from just east of Beaver Lake for about 30 miles into the Amery Ice Shelf. After an ANARE aircraft discovered it in 1956, ANCA named the formation for its resemblance to a jetty.
 Loewe Massif is a large rock massif in the eastern part of the Aramis Range. The surface of the massif is largely an undulating plateau from which Mount Loewe and the Medvecky Peaks rise. It was discovered by the ANARE southern party in1956. The name of the massif derives from Mount Loewe.
 Manning Massif is a large rock massif between Loewe Massif and McLeod Massif in the eastern part of the Aramis Range. It was plotted from air photographs, and was first visited by a party from the ANARE Prince Charles Mountains survey in 1969. The massif was named by ANCA for J. Manning, a surveyor at Mawson Station in 1967, and surveyor-in-charge of field survey operations during the ANARE Prince Charles Mountains surveys of 1969, 1971 and 1972.
It was plotted from ANARE air photos taken in 1956 and 1960, and was named by ANCA for William Allen McLaren, a glaciologist at Wilkes Station in 1965.
It was plotted from ANARE air photos taken in 1956 and 1960, and was named by ANCA for C.V. McLean, a senior diesel mechanic at Wilkes Station in 1963.
 McLeod Massif is a large rock massif just south of Manning Massif in the eastern part of the Aramis Range. It was plotted from air photographs, and first visited by the ANARE Prince Charles Mountains survey in 1969. The feature was named by ANCA for I.R. McLeod, geologist-in-charge of geological field operations during the ANARE Prince Charles Mountains surveys of 1969 and 1970.
 Murray Dome is a dome-shaped rock feature about 3 nautical miles (6 km) southeast of Mount McKenzie. Plotted from ANARE air photos taken in 1956 and 1960. Named by ANCA for Dr. L. Murray, medical officer at Macquarie Island in 1963 and at Wilkes Station in 1964.
 Radok Lake is a meltwater lake about four miles (6.4 km) long and marked by a slender glacier tongue feeding into it from the west, lying three miles (4.8 km) south-west of Beaver Lake and 15 miles (24 km) south-east of the Aramis Range.
 Saxton Ridge is a mountain ridge just south of Thomson Massif. Plotted from ANARE air photos taken in 1956. Named by ANCA for R.A. Saxton, officer in charge at Wilkes Station in 1963.
 Thomson Massif is a rock massif from which rise Mount Sundberg and Mount McGregor. Plotted from ANARE air photos taken in 1956 and 1960. Named by ANCA for R.B. Thomson, officer in charge at Wilkes Station in 1962.
 Walker Valley is a large, wide, snow-filled valley lying immediately west of Manning Massif. Mapped from ANARE air photographs. Named by ANCA for K.G. Walker, expedition assistant with the ANARE Prince Charles Mountains survey party in 1970.
 White Massif is a rock massif about 3 nautical miles (6 km) east-northeast of Thomson Massif in the Aramis Range Plotted from ANARE air photos taken in 1956 and 1960. Named by ANCA for R.F. White, senior technician (electronics) at Mawson Station in 1963 who died there on 18 October 1963.

Further reading 
 R.J. Tingey, GEOLOGICAL WORK IN ANTARCTICA 1971
 John Manning, Mapping Surveys in the Prince Charles Mountains of Antarctica, 2012, P 4
 Robert Clancy, John Manning, Henk Brolsma, Mapping Antarctica: A Five Hundred Year Record of Discovery, PP 249- 250
 Dieter K. Fütterer, Detlef Damaske, Georg Kleinschmidt, Hubert Miller, Franz Tessensohn, Antarctica: Contributions to Global Earth Sciences, P 84
 Whitehead, J., & McKelvey, B. (2001). The stratigraphy of the Pliocene—lower Pleistocene Bardin Bluffs Formation, Amery Oasis, northern Prince Charles Mountains, Antarctica.,  Antarctic Science, 13(1), 79–86.  https://doi.org/10.1017/S0954102001000128
 MCMINN, ANDREW (2000), Neogene glacial geology of the Prince Charles Mountains,Australian Antarctic Data Centre.  https://doi.org/10.4225/15/55EE3BF80172B
 B.C. MCKELVEY, M.J. HAMBREY, D.M. HARWOOD, M.C.G. MABIN4 P.-N. WEBB and J.M. WHITEHEAD, The Pagodroma Group - a Cenozoic record of the East Antarctic ice sheet in the northern Prince Charles Mountains, Antarctic Science 13 (4): 455-468 (2001)

External links 

 Aramis Range on USGS website
 Aramis Range on AADC website
 Aramis Range on SCAR website
 description of the Aramis Range
 Satellite image of the Aramis Range
 map of the Aramis Range
 updated long term weather forecast for the Aramis Range

 Amery Peaks on USGS website
 Amery Peaks on AADC website
 Amery Peaks on SCAR website
 Amery Peaks satellite image

References

Mountain ranges of Mac. Robertson Land